Live at Sweet Basil Volume 2 is an album by David Murray released on the Italian Black Saint label in 1984 and the second to feature his Big Band. It features performances by Murray, Olu Dara, Baikida Carroll, Craig Harris, Bob Stewart, Vincent Chancey, Steve Coleman, John Purcell, Rod Williams, Fred Hopkins and Billy Higgins conducted by Lawrence "Butch" Morris. The album was preceded by Live at Sweet Basil Volume 1.

Reception
The Allmusic review by Scott Yanow awarded the album 3 stars, stating, "There are some strong moments, plenty of dense ensembles, and a strong group spirit that makes one wish that the group had recorded a little more coherently in the studios during this period".

Track listing
All compositions by David Murray
 "Dewey's Circle" – 13:42
 "Roses" – 11:04
 "David Tune" – 12:22
 "Great Peace" – 9:43
 "Four Minute Marvin (For Marvin Gaye)" – 2:34
 Recorded live in concert at Sweet Basil, NYC, August 24–26, 1984

Personnel
 David Murray: tenor saxophone, bass clarinet
 Olu Dara: cornet
 Baikida Carroll: trumpet
 Craig Harris: trombone
 Bob Stewart: tuba
 Vincent Chancey: flugelhorn
 Steve Coleman: soprano saxophone, alto saxophone
 John Purcell: alto saxophone, clarinet
 Rod Williams: piano
 Fred Hopkins: bass
 Billy Higgins: percussion
 Lawrence "Butch" Morris: conductor

References

1984 live albums
David Murray (saxophonist) live albums
Black Saint/Soul Note live albums